Tumse Mil Kay is a Pakistani romantic drama series, produced by Jerjees Seja under their production house banner Idream Entertainment. The drama airs weekly on ARY Digital every Thursday. It stars Rabab Hashim, Affan Waheed, Sumbul Iqbal and Feroze Khan in lead roles.

Cast
Feroze Khan as Hamayun 
Sumbul Iqbal as Zil-e Huma
Rabab Hashim as Maira
Affan Waheed as Asad 
Yasir Shah as Mehroz
Seemi Pasha
Tehreem Zuberi
Saleem Mairaj 
Shehryar Zaidi
Farah Shah

References

Pakistani romantic drama television series